Danon Scorpion ( foaled 22 February 2019) is a Japanese Thoroughbred racehorse. He was one of the leading two-year-old colts in Japan in 2021 when he won his first two races including the Hagi Stakes and then ran third in the Asahi Hai Futurity Stakes. As a three-year-old he ran poorly on his seasonal debut but then recorded victories in the Arlington Cup and NHK Mile Cup.

Background
Danon Scorpion is a bay horse with a narrow white blaze bred in Japan by K I Farm. During his track career he carried the red and white colours of Danox Co Ltd the business software enterprise of his owner Masahiro Noda, and was trained by Takayuki Yasuda. 

He was from the first crop of foals sired by Lord Kanaloa, an outstanding sprinter-miler who was the 2013 Japanese Horse of the Year. Lord Kanaloa's other progeny include Almond Eye, Saturnalia and Tagaloa. Danon Scorpion in the second foal of his dam Lexie Lou, an outstanding Canadian racemare whose wins included the Queen's Plate and two legs of the Canadian Triple Tiara. At the 2016 Keeneland November Sale she sold for $1 million to KI Farm and after being bred to Frankel in 2017 she was exported to Japan.

Racing career

20201: two-year-old season
Danon Scorpion began his racing career in a contest for previously unraced juveniles over 1600 metres on good ground at Hanshin Racecourse on 20 June 2021. Ridden by Yuga Kawada he started the 0.3/1 favourite and won by a neck from the filly Rouge La Terre. Kawada was again in the saddle when the colt returned from a four-month break and was stepped up in class to contest the Listed Hagi Stakes over 1800 metres at Hanshin on 30 October. He started second choice in the betting and prevailed by a neck from the favourite Killer Ability after taking the lead in the straight.

On 19 December at Hanshin, Danon Scorpion was stepped up to Grade 1 class to contest Asahi Hai Futurity Stakes over 1600 metres and went off the 8.7/1 fourth choice in the betting. After settling in eighth place he made steady progress on the outside to take third place behind Do Deuce and Serifos.

In the official Japanese rankings Danon Scorpion was rated the  fourth-best two-year-old of 2021, behind Do Deuce, Serifos and Killer Ability.

2022: three-year-old season
Danon Scorpion began his second campaign in the Grade 3 Tokinominoru Kinen (a trial race for the Satsuki Sho) over 1800 metres at Tokyo Racecourse on 13 February. Ridden by Yuga Kawada he started the 4.3/1 fourth choice in the betting but came home seventh of the eleven runners behind Danon Beluga, beaten six lengths by the winner. The colt bypassed the Satsuki Sho and was dropped back in distance for the Arlington Cup over 1600 metres at Hanshin on 16 April when he started 1.5/1 favourite in an eighteen-runner field. After being settled in mid-division by Kawada he produced a sustained run on the outside in the straight, overtook the leader Taisei Divine in the final strides and won by a neck.

On 8 May at Tokyo, Danon Scorpion returned to Grade 1 class for the NHK Mile Cup in which he was partnered by Kawada and went off the 6.1/1 fourth choice in the betting behind Serifos, Industria and Matenro Orion (Shinzan Kinen). The other fourteen runners included Jean Gros (New Zealand Trophy), Purpur Ray (Falcon Stakes), King Hermes (Keio Hai Nisai Stakes) and Taisei Divine. Danon Scorpion raced on the outside in mid-division as Toshin Macau set the pace but closed on the leaders approaching the final turn. He moved up to dispute the lead in the straight, gained the advantage from Serifos 100 metres from the finish and held off the late challenge of Matenro Orion to win by a neck with the 228/1 outsider Kawakita Reverie the same distance away in third place. Kawada commented “I knew that the horses on the outside route were all coming up with a lot of force, so although I felt we had won crossing the wire, I had to be sure by watching the vision after the race. Danon Scorpion was in perhaps his best condition coming into this race so I had a lot of confidence... he was in good rhythm and balance so I had no worries.... The colt has great potential."

Pedigree

References

2019 racehorse births
Racehorses bred in Japan
Racehorses trained in Japan
Thoroughbred family 9-f